Urshelsky is a rural locality (a settlement) and the administrative center of Posyolok Urshelsky, Gus-Khrustalny District, Vladimir Oblast, Russia. Population:  The population was 3,783 as of 2010. There are 49 streets.

Geography 
Urshelsky is located 40 km west of Gus-Khrustalny (the district's administrative centre) by road. Sintsovo is the nearest rural locality.

References 

Rural localities in Gus-Khrustalny District
Sudogodsky Uyezd